Kolbeinn Tumason (1173–1208) was a member of the Ásbirningar family clan, and was one of the most powerful chieftains in Iceland around the turn of the 13th century. His power was probably at its height around 1200 AD. Kolbeinn used his influence to ensure that men in his favour received positions of power within the clergy, amongst them bishop Guðmundur Arason.  Guðmundur, unbeknownst to Kolbeinn, proved to be an advocate of clerical independence and resented interference from the secular chieftains. The two were soon at odds. In 1208, Kolbeinn and his followers attacked Guðmundur and his supporters in Hjaltadalur by Víðines. The ensuing battle is known as the Battle of Víðines. Kolbeinn died in the conflict, his head bashed in with a rock.

Kolbeinn the poet
Notwithstanding his opposition to bishop Guðmundur, sources indicate that Kolbeinn was a devoutly religious man of some education.  He is best known for composing the hymn Heyr himna smiður (English: "Hear, Smith of heavens") on his deathbed.  It is now a classic and often-sung Icelandic hymn.

References
 Árni Daníel Júlíusson, Jón Ólafur Ísberg, Helgi Skúli Kjartansson Íslenskur sögu atlas: 1. bindi: Frá öndverðu til 18. aldar Almenna bókafélagið, Reykjavík 1989 
 Sigurður Nordal et al., Sýnisbók íslenzkra bókmennta til miðrar átjándu aldar, Reykjavík 1953.

External links 
 A live performance of this poem sung by Árstíðir

1173 births
1208 deaths
Icelandic male poets
12th-century Icelandic people
Skalds
13th-century Icelandic poets
Goðar
Icelandic hymnwriters